A Tabriz rug/carpet is a type in the general category of Persian carpets from the city of Tabriz, the capital city of East Azarbaijan Province in north west of Iran. It is one of the oldest rug weaving centers and makes a huge diversity of types of carpets. The range starts at Bazaar quality of 24 raj (Number of knots per 7 cm of the widths of the rug) and on up to the incredibly fine 110 raj. Raj is the unit of knot density. It shows the rigidity of the rug which based on the number of strings used for the foundation of the rug. Strings materials are usually made of cotton or silk which is used for very fine rugs.

Tabriz has one of the most diverse displays of designs from medallion, Herati/Mahi, to figural, pictorial, and even 3-d shaped rugs.

The major producers in Tabriz today include: Alabaf of Tabriz, Galibafi Nassadji Tabriz, and Miri Brothers.

Tabriz has been a large and worldwide famous carpet making center in the Iran and the world. It played a significant role in development the rich traditions of the decorative and applied arts.

The art of Tabriz carpet was in its zenith in the 12th-16th centuries. About 200 Tabriz school masterpieces of the classical or "golden" period of the 14th century are characterized by a harmonic merge of the arts of miniature paintings and weaving, by a high level of craftsmanship demonstrated by artists and carpet weavers.

The Tabriz school can be divided into 2 subgroups: Tabriz and Ardabil.

Ardabil carpets 

" Ardabil", "Sheikh Safi", "Sarabi", "Shah Abbasi" and "Mir".

Tabriz carpets 

"Tabriz", "Heris", "Lachak-turanj", "Afshan", "Aghajly", "Dord Fasil", "Sardorud".

Tabriz
Different types of carpets were made here, including pile and flat-weave, with simple and complex composition. The carpet making art was passed on from generation to generation and was considered the most valued heirloom. The traditional topics for the Tabriz carpets are the ornamental patterns, with the following dominant background colors: cream, red or navy blue. The most typical for this school are rugs and carpets grouped under the common name “Lachak turanj”. In the middle of the center field and in the corners of the carpet (“lachak”)( triangle) there are “turanj”( Citron). The turanj in the center of the carpet is a symbol of the Moon, and the pattern formed by lozenges with the toothed leaves on the edges symbolizes the scales of the fish, which rise to the surface of the water at midnight to admire the Moon reflection. The origin of this composition dates back to the 9th-10th centuries. Often the topics for the Tabriz carpets are drawn from the works of the great Oriental poets. The carpets often depict the scenes of falconry or images of a ferocious lion. Well known are also Tabriz carpet-pictures with images of fragments of palaces and mosques, scenes of battles. Often, in creation of this or that ornamental pattern carpet weavers were inspired by the hand-painted covers of ancient books.

Heris
The name of these carpets is associated with the village of Heris or Herez to the North East of Tabriz. The stylistic decoration of the “Heris” carpets is rather unusual. The composition and common shapes of the details are created on the basis of the composition “lachak turanj”, which is formed by the foliate curve-linear patterns. However, with time the patterns of this composition became dotted and created an independent carpet pattern. Normally, the carpet was woven from memory, without a sketch. There is not surprising  because since the beginning of the 16th century till the present day the craftsmen in Heris have traditionally been making only this type of carpet, and they know perfectly well its design and pattern. Note that the residents of Heris are also renowned for production of flat-weave rugs – palases and kilims.

Four seasons

The “Dord fasil” (“Four Seasons” in Azerbaijani) is famous in Azerbaijan and other parts of Iran. The carpets of this type combine ancient elements of the decorative art, traditional symbolism dating back to the spiritual conceptions of the early farming age, and religious scenes. Each of the four parts of the carpet field is independent in terms of its composition. It depicts scenes of each season and represents the images of the peasants’ way of life. Autumn pictures: harvesting, tillage and sowing. Winter images: the peasants sweep the snow off the roofs, whip up the loaded donkeys to the village, in the foreground there is a worker with a spade offering his services while the background depicts the masterpiece of the Azerbaijani architecture of the 15th century – the “Blue Mosque” in Tabriz. The spring landscape is woven in vivid colors: trees in bloom, a shepherd with a flock of sheep, a girl listening to the sounds of his reed-pipe, and an old man with a tobacco pipe, talking to a peasant. The summertime picture: harvesting, women and children bind sheaves and take them off the field. The background shows a camelcade. Despite the independence of each of the scenes, they are unified in terms of composition and style. The illusion of space is achieved through the three-plane reproduction of the topic motifs. The dominating colors are of golden and red hues, which help to ensure a common rhythm.

Trees or Tree of Life
It is their composition that gave the name to these carpets rather than the place of production. In other parts of Iran, these carpets are widely known under the name of “Derakhti”, in Afghanistan “Bagghi” and in Azerbaijan “Agajly”. The composition of the center field the “Agajly” carpet consists largely of one or several trees and bushes, in rare cases – of a cluster of trees. The trees are of different appearance. In ancient times such compositions were based on some legendary events, love scenes, mythological and sometimes even religious and fanatical plots. The weeping willow was a symbol of love, the oak represented strength and courage, and the pomegranate personified abundance and luck. This type of design is used in Qum, Tabriz, Isfahan, Kashan

Subject carpets
While the carpets with abstract patterns obviously prevail, there were subject carpets as well. The most ancient of them is mentioned by Nizami, the outstanding Iranian poet of the 12th century, whose work served as an inexhaustible source of inspiration not only for numerous miniature painters but for the carpet art as well. One of the most ancient subject carpets was the Sasanid carpet called “Zimistan” (Winter), which was taken by the Arabs as a trophy after the devastation of the Sasanid empire. Contrary to its name, this carpet is said to depict spring landscapes. It was called “Winter” because it was laid in the palace during wintertime and its vivid patterns brightened the winter interior with the luxuriant colors of the gardens and fields in bloom. Perhaps Khosrov Parviz, the Sasanid King, reminisced about spring when looking at this carpet in winter. Seasons constitute the most favorite carpet subjects. Normally, they form the background for the famous Oriental buildings, including forts, palaces, mosques, temples – the Nature blossoms and withers but the stones remain intact… Khosrau, Farhad, Shirin, Bahrām Gōr, Iskander, Layla and Majnun – these characters created by Ferdosi, Nizami and Fizuli, as well as scenes from their poems are often depicted in the carpets, whose style reminds you of the miniatures by the painters of the celebrated Tabriz school flourishing at the time of the Safavids. The subject carpets were based on various topics, the most favorite being those of hunting and animals, literature plots and religious themes.

One of the traditional subjects is the image of Omar Khayam with his sweetheart. By virtue of the specific language of the miniature painting the carpet composition conveys the spirit and essence of Khayam’s poetry, and it does it with a great realistic force. The carpet bears the distichs and quatrains – verses and sections from the poems by Ferdosi, Saadi, Hafez, Sheikh Attar, with some sage maxims and adages about love.
 
Samples of Tabriz carpet:

References 

Iranian culture
Persian rugs and carpets
Tabriz